The Mastung bus bombing was a bomb attack on a bus carrying pilgrims returning from Iran on 21 January 2014, while it was passing through Mastung District on Quetta-Taftan Highway. At least 22 people died and another 32 were wounded in the attack.

Incident
The bus came under attack at 6:15 pm when it crossed Pakistan-Iran border in Taftan on Quetta-Taftan Highway. During the bombing it was originally confirmed that 22 pilgrims were killed and 32 were injured, eight of which were women. Later on it turned that two injured pilgrims have died due to the severity of their injuries bring the number of dead to 24. According to Asadur Rehman Gilani, a homeland security secretary, an estimate of 80 to 100 kilograms of explosives were used to destroy the bus and three other vehicles. The attack was condemned by Prime Minister Nawaz Sharif, President Mamnoon Hussain as well as such parties as the Majils Wahadat-e-Muslimeen and Hazara Democratic Party. Abdul Malik Baloch have reported the attack in which Lashkar-e-Jhangvi claimed responsibility.

Aftermath
On the same day it was reported that amount of dead have climbed to 29 while the bodies were laid to rest next day at Bahisht-e-Zainab and Bahisht-e-Zahra graveyards which are located at Hazara Town and Quetta. On 23 January the relatives of the victims held a sit in which continued till Thursday night. As of 24 January 2014 the Pakistani forces have detained 25 individuals and have restricted further travel to the region.

References

2014 murders in Pakistan
21st-century mass murder in Pakistan
Attacks in Pakistan in 2014
Improvised explosive device bombings in Pakistan
Terrorist incidents in Pakistan in 2014
Mastung District
Mass murder in 2014
Massacres in Pakistan
Crime in Balochistan, Pakistan
Lashkar-e-Jhangvi attacks